Yeyik is a township in central Niya County (Minfeng), Hotan Prefecture, Xinjiang, China on the upper reaches of the Yeyik River.


Name
Yeyik means 'spread out' in Uyghur. The Uyghur is transcribed into Mandarin Chinese as Yeyike (pinyin) (Yeh-i-k'o (Wade-Giles)). Yeyik has also been known as Yiyike and Ya-li-ka.

History
In 1958, Yeyik Commune was established.

In 1984, Yeyik Commune became Yeyik Township.

In September 2018, Yeyik was listed as a Strong Town Model Organization in Agricultural Production.

Geography

Administrative divisions
Yeyik includes six villages:

Villages (Mandarin Chinese Hanyu Pinyin-derived names except where Uyghur is provided):
Ayitage 
Yeyik (Yeyike;  / )
Muchang
Jinquan 
Aqtash (Aketashi;  / )
Yengiawat (Ying'awati;  / )

Former villages:
Kunwu'ertuzi
Segeziwuyi

Economy
Agriculture and animal husbandry are the mainstays of the economy. Crops include wheat, highland barley, black-eyed peas, etc.

Demographics

Nature and wildlife
A Demoiselle Crane was tracked passing through Yeyik suggesting that Yeyik is a stopover on the autumn migration route of the Demoiselle Crane.

Historical maps

Notes

References

Populated places in Xinjiang
Township-level divisions of Xinjiang